Cryptamorpha desjardinsii, known generally as the Desjardin's beetle or Desjardin's flat beetle, is a species of silvanid flat bark beetle in the family Silvanidae. It is found in the Caribbean, North America, Oceania, Europe, and New Zealand. It varies in size from 3.4 to 4.4 millimetres.

References

Further reading

 
 

Silvanidae
Articles created by Qbugbot
Beetles described in 1844